Dorninton (also called Dornington) is an unincorporated community in Putnam County, in the U.S. state of Ohio.

History
A post office called Dornington was established in 1892, and remained in operation until 1904. The community was located on a railroad line.

References

Unincorporated communities in Putnam County, Ohio
Unincorporated communities in Ohio